Zakria Alhusain (born 1 January 1991) is a Syrian professional basketball player. He plays for Al-Wathba of the Syrian Basketball League. He is also a player of the Syrian national team.

Senior Syrian basketball from Al-Wathba Club.

Zakaria Al-Hussein is the top scorer in the first leg of the Syrian Basketball League.

He scored 34 points in one match in the Orontes.

References

External links
 Zakria Alhusain at EuroBasket
 Zakria Alhusain at Global Sports Archive
 Zakria Alhusain at RealGM

1991 births
Living people
Asian Games competitors for Syria
Basketball players at the 2018 Asian Games
Centers (basketball)
Sportspeople from Homs
Syrian men's basketball players